Laevinesta is a genus of sea snails, marine gastropod mollusks in the family Fissurellidae, the keyhole limpets.

Species
Species within the genus Laevinesta include:
Laevinesta atlantica (Pérez Farfante, 1947)

References

External links

Fissurellidae
Monotypic gastropod genera